Wyrd Sisters is a six-part animated television adaptation of the book of the same name by Terry Pratchett, produced by Cosgrove Hall Films, and first broadcast on 18 May 1997. It was the second film adaptation of an entire Discworld novel (following the Welcome to the Discworld short, which was based on a fragment of the 1991 novel Reaper Man, and the Soul Music series).

Plot
Wyrd Sisters, the 6-episode television animated fantasy-comedy series closely follows the plot of the novel, which features three witches: Granny Weatherwax; Nanny Ogg, matriarch of a large tribe of Oggs, who owns the most evil cat in the world, (Greebo); and Magrat Garlick, the junior witch, who firmly believes in occult jewellery, even though none of it works.

King Verence I of Lancre is murdered by his cousin, Duke Felmet, and the King's crown and a baby are given by an escaping servant to the three witches. The witches hand the crown and the child to a troupe of travelling actors, acknowledging that destiny will eventually take its course and Tomjon will grow up to defeat Duke Felmet.

However, the kingdom is angry and doesn't want to wait 18 years so the witches move it forward in time. Meanwhile, the duke has decided to get a play written and performed that is favourable to him so he sends the court jester to Ankh-Morpork to recruit the same travelling (now stationary) company that Tomjon is in.

The only problem is that Tomjon does not want to be king.

Cast and characters

Main 
Christopher Lee as Death
Jane Horrocks as Magrat Garlick
June Whitfield as Nanny Ogg
Annette Crosbie as Granny Weatherwax
Eleanor Bron as Duchess Felmet
Les Dennis as The Fool (King Verence II) and Tomjon
Andy Hockley 
David Holt
Jimmy Hibbert as Verence I of Lancre
Rob Rackstraw as Duke Felmet
Melissa Sinden
Taff Girdlestone

Episodes

Production

Development 
The series is based on Terry Pratchett's book Wyrd Sisters in his novel series Discworld. The first episode was released on 18 May 1997, and further episodes were released weekly until the sixth and final one has aired on 22 June. Wyrd Sisters was also broadcast as a film that ran for two hours and 20 minutes.

References

External links
 

1997 British television series debuts
1997 British television series endings
1990s British animated television series
Discworld films and television series
1990s British television miniseries
British children's animated comedy television series
British children's animated fantasy television series
English-language television shows
Television series by Cosgrove Hall Films